This is a list of Southeast Missouri State Redhawks football players in the NFL Draft.

Key

Selections

References

Lists of National Football League draftees by college football team

Southeast Missouri State Redhawks NFL Draft